Lucas Vesco (born 28 January 1991) is an Argentine professional footballer who plays as a defender for Agropecuario.

Career
Rivadavia were Vesco's first senior career club, the defender played for them between 2008 and 2015; making sixty-eight appearances and scoring one goal, which came against 9 de Julio on 27 February 2010. During his time with Rivadavia, Vesco was loaned out to Argentine Primera División sides on two occasions. Racing Club loaned Vesco in August 2012, he remained with them for one year but failed to feature for their first-team; though was on the substitutes bench once in November. On 22 July 2013, Vesco joined Tigre on loan. Five appearances followed, including his professional debut on 9 August versus Olimpo.

January 2016 saw Vesco agree to join Agropecuario of Torneo Federal B. They won promotion to the 2016–17 Torneo Federal A in his first season, prior to being promoted again in the following campaign to Primera B Nacional. He scored his first goal on 13 May 2017 during a win over Mitre, as he made forty-one appearances over the course of his first two seasons.

Career statistics
.

Honours
Agropecuario
 Torneo Federal A: 2016–17

References

External links

1991 births
Living people
Sportspeople from Buenos Aires Province
Argentine footballers
Association football defenders
Torneo Argentino A players
Argentine Primera División players
Primera Nacional players
Rivadavia de Lincoln footballers
Racing Club de Avellaneda footballers
Club Atlético Tigre footballers
Club Agropecuario Argentino players